Balint Tarkany-Kovacs (1980 in Budapest) is one of Hungary’s foremost cimbalom players, who plays traditional Hungarian music and ethnojazz as well. He is the founder of the band Tarkany Muvek.

About 

Balint was born in Budapest in 1980, and had started learning the cimbalom at the age of seven. He graduated in Folk Cimbalom (BA) in the Franz Liszt Academy of Music traditional music faculty in 2011. Now he has been studying at the Cimbalom Teacher Faculty (MA), where his maestro is Kalman Balogh.

He is the founder of the band Tarkany Muvek, where he does not only play the cimbalom but composes songs and writes lyrics as well.  The band's recordings include the album Introducing Tárkány Müvek.  He also plays in Fonó Folk Band and Tündök band. He played all around Europe in festivals and tours. Now he lives in Budapest, Hungary.

Studies 

 2011- Studying at The Franz Liszt Academy of Music Folk Cimbalom Teacher (MA)learning from Kalman Balogh
 2011 Graduated at The Franz Liszt Academy of Music Diploma of Folk Cimbalom (BA) learning from Kalman Balogh
 1996 - 1998 Bela Bartok Music Conservatory (high school) learning from Beatrix Beresne Szollos
 1987 - 1995 Lovey - Klara Music Specialised Elementary School learning classical and folk from Beatrix Beresne Szollos

Discography 

 Korcsos és cigánycsárdás (Tündök zenekar, Táncház-Népzene 2008)
 Marossárpataki sebesforduló (Tündök zenekar, Új Élő Népzene 2008)
 You Etched Your Face in Mine (Tárkány Művek, 2010)
 Mit egyen a baba? (Alma együttes, 2010)
 Itt a nyár MAXI (Tárkány Művek, 2012)

Main performances 

 1997 Turkey, Izmir, folk festival with Csombor band
 1998 Sweden, Storjö Yran Festival Csombor band and Bartok Dance Group
 2001 France, Csombor band and Bihari Dance Group
 2002 Esztergom (HU) play on the welcoming ceremony of Emperor Akihito
 2003 Australia, Hungarian Week in Melbourne
 2004 Greece, Pentaton
 2006, 2007 Sziget Festival (HU), Rekontra
 2008 Welcoming ceremony of Ilham Aliyevv president of Azerbaijan
 2008 Hungarion State Opera, Tundok band
 2009 Belgium, Csombor band and Bihari Dance Group
 2009 SZIN Festival (HU), Tarkany Muvek
 2010 - 2012 New Theatre (HU) solo in the drama Bethlen
 2010 Budapest, Sandor Palace, the initiation ceremony of the Hungarian President Pal Schmitt
 2011 Fulek (SK), Tarkany Muvek
 2011 Gyilkostoi Sokadalom (RO), Tarkany Muvek
 2011 Diploma Concert in the Liszt Academy
 2012 Bratislava (SK) - Warszava (PL) tour, Tarkany Muvek
 2012 MUPA Palace of Arts (HU), Tarkany Muvek
 2012 Folk Hollydays Namest nad Oslavou (CZ), Fono ensemble

References

1980 births
Cimbalom players
Living people